Anger management is a psychotherapeutic technique.

Anger management may also refer to:

 Anger Management (film), a 2003 comedy film starring Adam Sandler and Jack Nicholson
 Anger Management (TV series), a 2012 TV series based on the film
 "The Anger Management", an episode of the television series, The O.C.
 Anger Management Tour, a series of Eminem concert tours
Anger Management (album), an album by rapper Luni Coleone
 Anger Management (mixtape), by rapper Rico Nasty and producer Kenny Beats
 "Anger Management" (Hope & Faith), from the first season of the American sitcom

See also
 Anger